Pierre Camille Cartier (March 10, 1878October 27, 1964) was a French jeweler. He was one of three sons of Alfred Cartier and the brother of Jacques Cartier and Louis Cartier. Pierre's grandfather, Louis-François Cartier had taken over the jewelry workshop of his teacher Adolphe Picard, in 1847, thereby founding the famous Cartier jewelry company. 

In 1902, Pierre opened and began to manage the London Cartier store and in 1909, he opened the New York store, moving it in 1917 to the current location of 653 Fifth Avenue, the neo-Renaissance mansion of banker Morton Plant. 

After the death of his brothers in 1942, Pierre based his shop in Paris until he retired to Geneva in 1947.

Cartier became the owner of the Hope Diamond and on January 28, 1911 sold it to Edward B. McLean. In a deal concluded in the offices of the McLean family's Washington Post newspaper, Pierre Cartier sold the diamond for US$180,000. A clause in the sale agreement for the diamond, that was widely believed to bring death and disaster to its owner, stated that "Should any fatality occur to the family of Edward B. McLean within six months, the said Hope diamond is agreed to be exchanged for jewelry of equal value". By March, the diamond had not been paid for in accordance with the terms in the sale agreement. Cartier hired a lawyer to sue McLean for payment who responded by saying it was on a loan for inspection. On February 2, 1912 the New York Times reported that the "Wealthy Purchasers of Famous Stone to Retain It Despite Sinister Reputation. "

References

Further reading
 

1878 births
1964 deaths
French jewellers
Cartier